Iker Carew Erazo Ormaza (born 9 February 2003) is a Norwegian footballer who plays as a forward for the College of Charleston Cougars.

Early life
Erazo was born in Murcia, Spain, but moved to Skien, Norway at the age of two. He joined the academy of Odd, but had to return to his parents’ native Ecuador after his grandfather needed support. While in Ecuador, he played for the academy that his father set up, Academia de Ceider Erazo.

Club career
He returned to Norway in 2017, re-joining the academy of Odd. In 2020, while still in the academy, he went on trial with English Premier League side Sheffield United. He left Odd in April 2022, stating that he was "not happy" about the way he was treated at the club. He joined Fourth Division side Urædd the same month.

College career
In July 2022, he moved to the United States to enrol at the College of Charleston, joining the college's soccer team, the Cougars. He scored three goals in sixteen appearances in his first season.

Personal life
Erazo's father, Ceider, was also a footballer, and won 27 caps for the Ecuador national football team. His brother, Jefferson, is also a footballer and played for the youth teams of Ecuador, and currently plays for Urædd.

His father decided on 'Carew' as his middle name in honour of former Norwegian international footballer John Carew, and 'Iker' as his first name after Spanish international Iker Casillas. He shares no relation with John Carew.

Career statistics

Club

Notes

References

External links
 

2003 births
Living people
Footballers from Murcia
College of Charleston alumni
Norwegian footballers
Spanish footballers
Ecuadorian footballers
Association football forwards
Norwegian Fourth Division players
Norwegian Second Division players
Odds BK players
Norwegian expatriate footballers
Norwegian expatriate sportspeople in the United States
Expatriate soccer players in the United States